John Mansfield (1822–1896) was an American soldier and politician.

John Mansfield may also refer to:

John Mansfield (MP), member for Beverley (UK Parliament constituency) in 1593
John Mansfield (footballer) (born 1946), English footballer
John Mansfield (judge) (born 1946), Australian judge
John Mansfield (politician) (1889–1970), British trade unionist and politician
John Mansfield (Royal Navy officer) (1893-1949), British admiral
John Mansfield School (1950s–2007) in the Dogsthorpe area of Peterborough, England

See also